Carex normalis, the greater straw sedge, is a species of sedge that was first described by Kenneth Mackenzie in 1919.

References

normalis
Plants described in 1919
Taxa named by Kenneth Kent Mackenzie